Wat Phia Wat is a Buddhist wat in Khoune district, Laos.

Overview 
Wat Phiat Wat is located in Muang Khoun, the former capital of Muang Phuan in the 14th century. What Phia Wat is said to be constructed in 1322 by Chao Lan Kham Khong, in order to house the first Buddhist statue in Xiangkhouang, which was brought over from Burma. In 1375, invading Chinese forces destroyed the complex and cut off the arm of the Buddha statue, but the Wat was later rebuild. In 1953, Wat Phia Wat was again destroyed during the First Indochina War, but rebuild in 1954. Finally, the Wat was bombed by the US airforce during the Second Indochina War. Wat Phia Wat collapsed, but the Buddha statue still survives, although suffering significant damage. A new temple was created after the war.

Gallery

References

Buddhist temples in Laos
Buildings and structures in Xiangkhouang province
14th-century Buddhist temples